Feng Chia University (FCU) is a private research university in Taiwan, located in Taichung. It was named after Chiu Feng-Chia one of the leaders of the military resistance against the Japanese invasion of Taiwan in 1895. 

Feng Chia University has partnership with Purdue University, RMIT University, University of Zaragoza, and San Jose State University.

History
In 1961, the Feng Chia College of Engineering and Business was established on Guanyin Mountain in Beitun District of Taichung City. Two years later, it was moved to its present location in Xitun District in central Taiwan. The school was granted university status in 1980 and its name changed to Feng Chia University (FCU).

In 2008, the APEC Research Center for Advanced Biohydrogen Technology was established on the FCU campus. In 2009, the Open Geospatial Consortium (OGC) designated the Geographic Information Systems Research Center as the first Asian standards testing center, as well as one of 20 official principal members.

Present
The university has 20,000 graduate and undergraduate students yearly in its nine colleges of Engineering, Business, Sciences, Construction and Development, Information and Electrical Engineering, Finance, Humanities and Social Sciences, School of Management and Development, School of Technology and Management. There are 33 academic departments (excluding undeclared honors programs), four independent graduate institutes and three independent doctoral programs.

In total, FCU offers 57 bachelor's, 76 master's and 14 doctoral degree programs. Since 2008, surveys of executives from Taiwan's top 1,000 enterprises have consistently ranked FCU in the top 10 for the quality of its graduates.

FCU is the third university in Taiwan to complete and receive marks of excellence on five National Science Council technology transfer projects.
In March 2017, Apple recently established Taiwan's first Apple Regional Training Center at FCU, which makes FCU the only university in Taiwan authorized to conduct Apple-certified training courses. In the future, all instructors in the Apple App teacher development program will be trained at FCU.

Academics

There are 37 specialized research centers on campus, including the Green Energy Development Center, Geographic Information Systems Research Center, Construction and Disaster Prevention Research Center, Information and Communication Security Research Center, and Center for Tang Dynasty Culture.

FCU recruits scholars from Taiwan and abroad. In the past three years, more than 40 chair professors have joined the faculty. They include Chin-Chen Chang, who is considered Taiwan's father of cryptography, and Chung-Jen Hsu, former general manager of Uni-President Enterprises Corporation. Chang is ranked number two in the world for the number of published research papers that have been included in the computer science database of the Digital Bibliography & Library Projects (DBLP).

The Green Energy Development Center has developed an anaerobic bioreactor. This bioreactor yields 151/hr biogas from every liter of anaerobic sludge, making it one of the best performing bioreactors in the world. Due to these and other achievements, FCU was chosen as the site for the APEC Research Center for Advanced Biohydrogen Technology, which was established in cooperation with APEC and the National Science Council. In addition, the Taiwan branch of the International Association for Hydrogen Energy (IAHE) has been established on the FCU campus. In 2011, FCU completed the world's first Bio-H2 gas station.

The Geographic Information Systems (GIS) Research Center has twice been honored by the US-based Environmental Systems Research Institute (ESRI) with a Special Achievement in GIS award. In 2010, this research center was invited to join the European Union's Plan4All project; among its 25 collaborative partners, FCU was the only academic organization from Taiwan. In that same year, the Open Geospatial Consortium (OGC) approved the GIS Research Center as its first software standards compliance testing center in Asia. It was also named one of 20 OGC principal members.

The Construction and Disaster Prevention Research Center brings together researchers from the fields of civil engineering, hydraulic engineering, water resources engineering and conservation, and geographic information systems. This center has developed technologies with applications for environmental conservation, slope land disaster prevention, and environmental monitoring. It also serves as a long-term partner of the National Science and Technology Center for Disaster Reduction, providing support for local government disaster prevention and rescue efforts. This center participated in the rebuilding efforts that followed Typhoon Morakot and received awards for its contributions and achievements from the Executive Yuan.

In cooperation with Renmin University of China, the Center for the Tang Dynasty Culture spent six years proofreading and editing the Quan Tangfu (The Complete Tang Odes). The center's edited version of this important ancient Chinese compilation has been included in many library collections in Europe, North America, Japan, and Korea.

College of Information and Electrical Engineering
Automatic Control Engineering
Bachelor's Program of International Electrical Engineering
Communications Engineering
Electrical Engineering
Electronic Engineering
Honor Program in Information and Electrical Engineering
Information Engineering and Computer Science
Master's Program in Biomedical Informatics and Biomedical Engineering
Ph. D. Program in Electrical and Communications Engineering
College of Engineering
 Aerospace and System Engineering
Chemical Engineering
Fiber and Composite Materials
Industrial Engineering and Systems Management
Master Program in Green Energy Science and Technology
Mechanical and Computer-Aided Engineering
The Ph. D. program in Mechanical and Aeronautical Engineering
Bachelor's Program of Precision Systems Design
Master's Program of Electro-acoustics
Master's Program of Creative Design
College of Sciences
 Applied Mathematics
Environmental Engineering and Science
Materials Science and Engineering
Photonics
College of Business
Accounting
Bachelor's Program of International Business Administration
Business Administration
Continuing Education Program in Business
Cooperative Economics
Economics
Public Finance
Financial and Economic Law
International Trade
Management of Technology
Marketing
Ph.D. Program in Business
Statistics
College of Finance
Finance
Risk Management and Insurance
Ph.D Program of Finance
Master's Program of Finance
Bachelor's Program of Financial Engineering and Actuarial Science
College of Construction and Development
Architecture
Civil Engineering
Continuing Education Bachelor's Program of Interior Design
Landscape and Recreation
Land Management
Ph.D Program in Civil and Hydraulic Engineering
Transportation Technology and Management
Urban Planning and Spatial Information
Water Resources Engineering and Conservation
College of Humanities and Social Sciences
 Chinese Literature
Foreign Languages and Literature
History and Historical Relics
Language Center
Public Policy
Center for Chinese Language and Culture
School of Management Development
DMBA
EMBA
International School of Technology and Management
International Master of Business Administration
FCU-ZLC Dual Degree Program
FCU-Purdue Undergraduate Dual Degree Program
FCU-RMIT Undergraduate Dual Degree Program
FCU-SJSU Undergraduate Dual Degree Program

Rankings

2017
In 2017, FCU ranked as the top private comprehensive university in Taiwan by Times Higher Education "Best Universities in the Asia-Pacific Region 2017." In 2017, FCU ranked as the top private comprehensive university in Taiwan in the Engineering & Technology and Social Sciences & Management categories. In addition, for the third consecutive year, FCU ranked as the number one private comprehensive university in Taiwan in the Engineering & Technology category's Computer Science & Information Systems by the Quacquarelli Symonds.

2016
In 2016, FCU was the top private comprehensive university in the 2016 QS Asia University Rankings. That same year, FCU was honored with a number one ranking in the Ministry of Education's Program for Promoting Teaching Excellence. Cheers magazine once again honored FCU with top spot in its annual ranking of public and private universities. In 2016, FCU was ranked among Asia University Rankings as 140th by the Quacquarelli Symonds.

2015
In 2015, Feng Chia University ranked ninth in Taiwan and 78th in Asia in the QS World University Rankings by Subject 2015 - Computer Science & Information Systems. FCU once again ranked as the top private comprehensive university in the QS Asia University Rankings. In 2015, FCU was ranked among Asia University Rankings on 171th by the Quacquarelli Symonds. And the individual subject world rankings from QS put FCU on 317th in Computer Science.

2014
In 2014, FCU rated in the top 100 in the Times Higher Education World University Rankings (BRICS and Emerging Economies Ranking). FCU was ranked among Asia University Rankings at 153rd by the Quacquarelli Symonds. And the individual subject world rankings from QS put FCU on 106th in Accounting & Finance.

2013
In 2013, FCU was ranked among Asia's top 100 universities by the UK's The Times Higher Education Supplement.

2012
In 2012, FCU was ranked among the top 100 global "Emerging" universities in a survey published in the UK's The Times Higher Education Supplement.

Notable alumni
 Amanda Chou, actress
 Hsu Shu-hua, member of Legislative Yuan
 Liao Liou-yi, minister of the Interior (2008-2009)
 Ma Wen-chun, member of Legislative Yuan
 Phil Chang, singer
 Tseng Yung-chuan, secretary-general of the ROC Presidential Office (2015-2016)
 Wu Hong-mo, minister of Public Construction Commission (2018)

See also
 Tsinghua Big Five Alliance
 List of universities in Taiwan

References

 
Educational institutions established in 2021
2021 establishments in Taiwan
Universities and colleges in Taiwan
Universities and colleges in Taichung
Comprehensive universities in Taiwan